Evergestis funalis is a moth in the family Crambidae. It was described by Augustus Radcliffe Grote in 1878. It is found in North America, where it has been recorded from Alaska, Arizona, British Columbia, California, Colorado, Nevada, Oregon, Utah and Washington.

The wingspan is 23–27 mm. Adults are on wing from May to October.

Subspecies
Evergestis funalis funalis
Evergestis funalis angelina Munroe, 1974 (California)
Evergestis funalis columbialis Munroe, 1974 (British Columbia)
Evergestis funalis insulalis Barnes & McDunnough, 1914 (British Columbia: Vancouver Island)
Evergestis funalis wallacensis Munroe, 1974 (Idaho)

References

Evergestis
Moths described in 1878
Moths of North America